Robert McRoberts (12 July 1874 – 27 February 1959) was a Scottish professional association football player and manager. He played as a centre forward.

McRoberts was born in Coatbridge, Scotland. He started his football career at Airdrieonians and Albion Rovers in the Scottish League, and went on to play for Gainsborough Trinity, Small Heath (Birmingham) and Chelsea, where he also played as a defender, in the Football League. He was Small Heath's leading goalscorer for three successive seasons, from 1899–1900 to 1901–02, and was Chelsea's first ever £100 signing, playing in their first League game in September 1905. On 4 November 1905, as Chelsea beat Barnsley 6–0 in a home league match, McRoberts scored the club's first-ever penalty.

After retiring from playing, he came back to Birmingham where in June 1911 he was appointed their first full-time professional team manager. Previously the team had been selected by a committee. He managed the club for four years.

McRoberts died in Birkenhead, England, at the age of 84.

Sources

References

External links
Chelsea F.C. official website

1874 births
1959 deaths
Footballers from Coatbridge
Scottish footballers
Association football forwards
Airdrieonians F.C. (1878) players
Albion Rovers F.C. players
Gainsborough Trinity F.C. players
Birmingham City F.C. players
Chelsea F.C. players
English Football League players
Scottish Football League players
Scottish football managers
Birmingham City F.C. managers
English Football League managers